The 2016 Africa Eco Race was the 8th edition of the rally-raid which replaced the Dakar Rally after its departure to South-America.

Paul Ullevalseter (with KTM, won 9 of the 11 contested stages) and Anton Shibalov (with Kamaz, won 7 of the 12 stages), like in 2015, dominated completely the race in bikes and trucks categories, while Kanat Shagirov took the race lead yet in Morocco and keep it to the end.

Stages

Summary

Bikes
The race was marked by high hardness on the stages of the great soft dunes in Mauritania which caused major changes in the overall classification, particularly in stages 9 and 10. As in 2015, Pål Ullevalseter completely dominated the race, finishing with a lead over 6  hours, being followed by the amazing Andrew Newland, a civil-contraceur. Anastasiya Nifontova has always been in the podium places until she had an accident in stage 9. The Portuguese Jose Fernando Moreira de Sousa (father) and José Fernando de Jesus Sousa Jr. (son) worked as a team and achieved five podiums and finished 7th and 8th respectively .

Cars
The Kazakh driver Sazonov dominated the start of the competition with his Hummer until he had an accident during 4th stage, giving way to his compatriot Shagirov in Toyota Hilux Overdrive, which managed to keep the lead until the end, despite the attacks of buggys, more effective in the dunes which ended in the following positions. The last year's winner Jean Antoine Sabatier was only 4th place. Sazonov was 7 between the cars and the 2nd best 4WD. Ricardo Leal dos Santos started the race with a 3rd place, but soon had mechanical problems finishing only 12th in cars, 3rd among the 4WD.

Trucks
In trucks category, complete domination by Kamaz and defending champion Anton Shibalov, only interrupted by Tomas Tomecek in stages 9 and 10 (when  Kamaz faced problems), despite the problems he had in the 4th stage (2 flat tyres and broken shock-absorber) and early loss of his assistance truck due to mechanical issues. A breakdown in the 2nd Kamaz of Kuprianov would put him out of the podium completed by Elisabete Jacinto making of regularity her main weapon.

Stage results

Bikes

Cars

Trucks

Final standings

Bikes

Cars

Trucks

References

External links
 

Africa Eco Race
Africa Eco Race
Africa Eco Race
Africa Eco Race
Africa Eco Race